Micragrotis puncticostata is a species of moth of the family Noctuidae first described by George Hampson in 1902. It is found in Africa, including South Africa.

External links
 

Endemic moths of South Africa
Noctuinae
Fauna of Lesotho